Second Presbyterian Church (also known as Central Presbyterian Church) is a historic church building in Downtown Columbus, Ohio. It was built in 1857 in a Romanesque style and was added to the National Register of Historic Places in 1983. It closed on November, 2011. The site was previously the location of the first public school in Columbus, built in 1826.

The building was acquired by Columbus Association for the Performing Arts in 2013, and is being repurposed as a performance venue. CAPA CEO William Conner Jr. said the church building is "acoustically near perfect".

References

External links
 

Presbyterian churches in Ohio
Churches on the National Register of Historic Places in Ohio
National Register of Historic Places in Columbus, Ohio
Romanesque Revival church buildings in Ohio
Churches completed in 1857
Churches in Columbus, Ohio
Buildings in downtown Columbus, Ohio
1857 establishments in Ohio
Columbus Register properties